Aralia hypoglauca is a species of flowering plant in the family Araliaceae. It has been treated as the only species Hunaniopanax hypoglaucus of the genus Hunanioglaucus.

References 

Araliaceae